The 2021 Corn Belt 150 presented by Premier Chevy Dealers was the 14th stock car race of the 2021 NASCAR Camping World Truck Series season and the inaugural running of the event, after Eldora Speedway's dirt race was moved to Knoxville Raceway. The race was held on Friday, July 9, 2021 in Knoxville, Iowa at Knoxville Raceway. The race was extended to 179 laps from the scheduled 150 laps due to numerous green-white-checker attempts. Austin Hill driving for Hattori Racing Enterprises would survive and win the event after dodging numerous wrecks and a wild ending to the event. Chandler Smith of Kyle Busch Motorsports and Grant Enfinger of ThorSport Racing would be able to come in 2nd and 3rd, respectively. Norm Benning would get his first Top 20 of the year, in a damaged truck finishing 19th.

The race was highly criticized by NASCAR fans and drivers. Drivers would report that other drivers had no respect for others on the track, contributing to the amount of wrecks during the race. Fans would criticize the way NASCAR handled the race, saying that NASCAR should not had raced on dirt due to the amount of wrecks that happened, and that the race was similar to a demolition derby. 

The race was the NASCAR Camping World Truck Series debuts for Morgan Alexander, Jessica Friesen, Parker Price-Miller, Devon Rouse and Donny Schatz.

Background

Entry list 

*Driver would change to Chris Windom, due to a leg injury Michael Annett had suffered.

Practice

Qualifying 
Qualifying was set by heats, and a points system. There were 4 heats of 10 cars. As only 40 trucks entered the race, no drivers would not qualify. The way drivers would get their positions worked like this: Drivers would get 10 points for 1st, 9 points for 2nd, etc. Additionally, for every car passed, drivers would get an additional point for every car passed. No negative points were given. If a driver ended behind where they started, they would just get no passing points. The points would not be good for the regular season.

Derek Kraus of McAnally-Hilgemann Racing would get the most points and therefore take the pole position.

Heat #1

Heat #2

Heat #3

Heat #4

Starting lineup

Race

Pre-race ceremonies 
For pre-race ceremonies, Jason Reed, president of the Marin County Fair Association would give out the command to fire engines.

Race

Post-race driver comments 
Many drivers and teams seemed displeased and angry post-race. Sheldon Creed, involved in the big one advocated for the removal of Trucks at Knoxville said "We don't belong here. We should be down at Iowa Speedway where these trucks are made for." Carson Hocevar commented that "I think everyone from the dirt community is just going to sit there, point at us, and laugh," criticizing the amount of chaos that happened. Kyle Strickler would comment on the seeming lack of respect on track: "The total lack of respect for other drivers and other drivers' equipment last night absolutely blew my mind. I think all the spoiled ass rich punk kids should be in the shop first thing on Monday morning so they can fix all this shit they tore up. Maybe then they'll think twice about blasting people out of the way when they realize how much it takes to make it to the race track every weekend." This was a comment that many drivers agreed with, including Hocevar and Nemechek. 

Some drivers were angry at McAnally-Hilgemann Racing driver Derek Kraus, with both Grant Enfinger and Tyler Ankrum spinning Kraus after the race after wrecking people for position. Austin Wayne Self said "In my opinion, I knew the race was aggressive but there was a couple of guys out there and [Derek Kraus] was definitely one that was very disrespectful to people and wasn't really racing. I mean, he was just pushing people out of the way and wrecking people and tearing stuff up."

Chandler Smith, who had led a race-high 71 laps, had said "I can’t catch a break, it feels like. I get so close to these wins — and something happens. Or we have a really good day and something happens. (Friday), we had a really solid day. … I really thought that was going to be ours there, but it is what it is I guess.”

Grant Enfinger would seem to forgive the rough driving and wrecks, as drivers were desperate for a win and will do anything to win, stating "There's no penalty for rough driving when we're putting all this on 60-70 mph short track to be honest."

Donny Schatz, making his debut in NASCAR, seemed flabbergasted at the amount of wrecks and torn-up cars, saying that "A lot of stuff got tore up and I don’t know if that’s normal or not around here, but it sure seems like it based on what I heard in the infield care center."

Austin Hill seemed the only one coming back home happy, with him taking the victory. Hill had this to say: "Winning at a place like Knoxville definitely puts your name on the map. I’m not a dirt guy — so I don’t know a ton about dirt racing — but I know about Knoxville and the history here. It’s a cool place to win at, for sure. This builds our confidence, for sure, and there’s no telling how many races we can win going forward.”

Race results 
Stage 1 Laps: 40

Stage 2 Laps: 40

Stage 3 Laps: 99

References

2021 NASCAR Camping World Truck Series
NASCAR races at Knoxville Raceway
Corn Belt 150
Corn Belt 150